In Greek mythology, Antiphates (Ancient Greek: Ἀντιφάτης) is the name of five characters.

 Antiphatês, son of Melampus and Iphianeira, the daughter of Megapenthes. He married Zeuxippe, the daughter of Hippocoon. Their children were Oecles and Amphalces.
Antiphates, one of Greek warriors who hid in the Trojan horse.
 Antíphates, a Trojan warrior, slain by Leonteus, commander of the Lapiths during the Trojan War.
Antiphates, King of the Laestrygones, a mythological tribe of gigantic cannibals. He was married and had a daughter. When he was visited by a scouting party sent by Odysseus, he ate one of the men on the spot and raised a hue-and-cry to ensure most of the rest of Odysseus' company would be hunted down.
Antiphates, son of Sarpedon, who accompanied Aeneas to Italy where he was killed by Turnus.

Notes

References 

 Apollodorus, The Library with an English Translation by Sir James George Frazer, F.B.A., F.R.S. in 2 Volumes, Cambridge, MA, Harvard University Press; London, William Heinemann Ltd. 1921. ISBN 0-674-99135-4. Online version at the Perseus Digital Library. Greek text available from the same website.
Diodorus Siculus, The Library of History translated by Charles Henry Oldfather. Twelve volumes. Loeb Classical Library. Cambridge, Massachusetts: Harvard University Press; London: William Heinemann, Ltd. 1989. Vol. 3. Books 4.59–8. Online version at Bill Thayer's Web Site
 Diodorus Siculus, Bibliotheca Historica. Vol 1-2. Immanel Bekker. Ludwig Dindorf. Friedrich Vogel. in aedibus B. G. Teubneri. Leipzig. 1888–1890. Greek text available at the Perseus Digital Library.
Homer, The Iliad with an English Translation by A.T. Murray, Ph.D. in two volumes. Cambridge, MA., Harvard University Press; London, William Heinemann, Ltd. 1924. . Online version at the Perseus Digital Library.
Homer, Homeri Opera in five volumes. Oxford, Oxford University Press. 1920. . Greek text available at the Perseus Digital Library.
 Homer, The Odyssey with an English Translation by A.T. Murray, PH.D. in two volumes. Cambridge, MA., Harvard University Press; London, William Heinemann, Ltd. 1919. . Online version at the Perseus Digital Library. Greek text available from the same website.
 Publius Vergilius Maro, Aeneid. Theodore C. Williams. trans. Boston. Houghton Mifflin Co. 1910. Online version at the Perseus Digital Library.
 Publius Vergilius Maro, Bucolics, Aeneid, and Georgics. J. B. Greenough. Boston. Ginn & Co. 1900. Latin text available at the Perseus Digital Library.
 Tryphiodorus, Capture of Troy translated by Mair, A. W. Loeb Classical Library Volume 219. London: William Heinemann Ltd, 1928. Online version at theoi.com
 Tryphiodorus, Capture of Troy with an English Translation by A.W. Mair. London, William Heinemann, Ltd.; New York: G.P. Putnam's Sons. 1928. Greek text available at the Perseus Digital Library.

Princes in Greek mythology
Kings in Greek mythology
Achaeans (Homer)
Trojans
Characters in the Aeneid
Characters in the Odyssey